St. Catharines Transit (SCT) was a public transit agency which provided bus services to St. Catharines, Ontario, and the neighbouring city of Thorold. The St. Catharines Transit Commission took over operation of transit services within the city from Canadian National Transportation in 1961. In January 2023, St. Catharines Transit was merged with Niagara Falls Transit and Welland Transit to form a single regional transit service, Niagara Region Transit

The Transit Operations Facility opened in 1991 and the Downtown Terminal (within a regional district building of the Ontario Ministry of Transportation) opened in 1996. The bus terminal is also served by Coach Canada for intercity coach service to Toronto, with connections to a number of major cities throughout Canada and the United States.

History 
Local public transportation in the area originally consisted of horse drawn cars, subsequently upgraded to electric railway service. Niagara, St. Catharines and Toronto Railway Company, founded in 1898, was acquired by the Canadian Northern Railway in 1908 which became Canadian National Railways in 1918 and converted to bus operations after 1931. The portion of this system operating within the City of St. Catharines was transferred to the St. Catharines Transit Commission in 1961, which adopted the operating name of St. Catharines Transit in 1974. All St. Catharines Transit services and equipment were transfered to Niagara Region Transit in January of 2023 to create a single unified regional transit service that included Welland Transit and Niagara Falls Transit. However, buses in the old St. Catharines Transit livery can continue to be seen as not all have been converted to the new livery.

In 2022, the service began exploring an electrification of its existing diesel fleet.

Former Services

Regular routes 
The St. Catharines Transit Commission (SCT) operates most of their routes through Downtown St. Catharines, with routes meeting at the Downtown Bus Terminal.  Additional main transfer points also existed at The Pen Centre, Fairview Mall, Thorold Towpath Terminal, and at Brock University.

The majority of the routes operated weekdays using one numbering scheme, while weekday evenings, Saturdays, Sundays and major holidays operated with a separate numbering scheme.

Though it may appear confusing at first glance, many routes interlined, meaning that they continued to other routes once reaching their terminus.  This occurs in at the bus terminal in Downtown St. Catharines, and at both northern and southern terminals.

Daytime Bus Routes 
Although the services are no longer operated by St. Catharines Transit, they continue to operate largely unchanged under Niagara Region Transit as of February, 2023.

Paratransit
In addition to accessible bus routes, which enable those with reduced mobility to board a 'low floor' transit bus, St. Catharines Transit also provides paratransit services for those who cannot board a regular city bus and accessible bus service is not available.

Brock Hub
Located at Brock University this is the main interchange for bus travel within the Niagara Region and to points beyond. Connections are provided by St. Catharines, Niagara and Welland Transit Commissions and Coach Canada. Centrally located to all the local transit services and adjacent to Hwy 406, the university campus is ideal for this purpose.

Former Fleet 
In January 2023, St. Catharines Transit's fleet was transferred to Niagara Region Transit as part of the amalgamation of local transit services in the region.

 New Flyer Industries D40LF
 New Flyer Industries DE40LF 
 New Flyer Industries D60LF
 New Flyer Industries XD40
 New Flyer Industries XD60
 Nova Bus LFS/LFSA

See also

 Public transport in Canada

References

External links

St. Catharines Transit conventional transit roster at CPTDB Wiki

Transit agencies in Ontario
Transport in St. Catharines